Remir Amirovich Khaidarov (born December 29, 1977) was a Russian professional ice hockey player.

External links

1977 births
2012 deaths
Ak Bars Kazan players
Barys Astana captains
Barys Nur-Sultan players
HC Khimik Voskresensk players
HC Neftekhimik Nizhnekamsk players
Russian ice hockey defencemen